Ian George McCurdy Wingfield GBS served as Solicitor General of Hong Kong from 2007 to 2010.

Early life

Wingfield was born in London and graduated from the University of East Anglia in 1970.

Career

Wingfield was called to the English Bar at Inner Temple in 1974 and to the Hong Kong Bar in 1994.

He joined the Hong Kong Government as Government Counsel in January 1982.  He was promoted to Senior Government Counsel in October 1982, to Deputy Principal Government Counsel in March 1985, and to Principal Government Counsel in March 1988.  He was further promoted to Law Officer in November 1991 and since then held the positions of Law Officer (Civil Law), Law Officer (International Law).  He was appointed Solicitor General of Hong Kong in 2007.

In 2010, he left the Department of Justice and resumed practice as a barrister at the private bar in Hong Kong.

Awards

Wingfield was awarded the Gold Bauhinia Star in 1999 for his public service in the Department of Justice.

Marriage

Wingfield is married to Clare-Marie Beeson, a former Judge of the Court of First Instance of the High Court of Hong Kong.

References

Year of birth missing (living people)
Living people
Alumni of the University of East Anglia
Members of the Inner Temple
Recipients of the Gold Bauhinia Star
Solicitors General of Hong Kong